is a retired Japanese judoka.

Okaizumi is from Kamikawa, Saitama. He began judo with his older brother at the dojo near his house. Okaizumi belonged to Nippon Steel after graduation from Tokai University.

In 1994, he won a gold medal at the Asian Games held in Hiroshima, Japan. In 1995, he also participated in the World Championships held in Chiba but was defeated by Paweł Nastula from Poland (Movie).

As of 2010, he has coached Nippon Steel Hirohata judo club since 2002 and All-Japan women's judo team since 2006.

Achievements
1986 - All-Japan Junior Championships (-86 kg) 3rd
1988 - All-Japan Junior Championships (-86 kg) 3rd
1992 - All-Japan Businessgroup Championships (-95 kg) 2nd
1993 - Kodokan Cup (-95 kg) 1st
 - All-Japan Businessgroup Championships (-95 kg) 1st
1994 - Asian Games (-95 kg) 1st
 - Jigoro Kano Cup (-95kg) 1st
 - All-Japan Selected Championships (-95kg) 2nd
 - Kodokan Cup (-95kg) 1st
1995 - World Championships (-96 kg) 3rd
 - All-Japan Selected Championships (-95kg) 1st
1996 - All-Japan Selected Championships (-95 kg) 3rd

References 

Japanese male judoka
Sportspeople from Saitama Prefecture
1968 births
Living people
Tokai University alumni
Asian Games medalists in judo
Judoka at the 1994 Asian Games
Asian Games gold medalists for Japan
Medalists at the 1994 Asian Games
20th-century Japanese people
21st-century Japanese people